Antrocaryon is a genus of flowering plants in the cashew family, Anacardiaceae. The genus is found in Tropical West Africa to Uganda.

Taxonomy

Species

Species include:
Antrocaryon amazonicum (Ducke) B.L.Burtt & A.W.Hill
Antrocaryon klaineanum Pierre
Antrocaryon micraster A.Chev. & Guillaumin 
Antrocaryon nannanii De Wild.
Antrocaryon schorkopfii Engl.

References

 
Anacardiaceae
Anacardiaceae genera
Taxonomy articles created by Polbot